Distorted is the self-titled first EP released by Israeli oriental death/doom band Distorted in September 2001. Most tracks on the EP were later re-recorded for the band's debut full-length album.

Track listing
 "Almost Dead" - 4:53
 "Sometimes" - 5:19
 "Children of Fall" - 3:44
 "Sorry" - 4:26
 "Dishate" - 3:27

2001 debut EPs
Distorted albums